Chalu is a town under the administration of Huoqiu County, Anhui, China. , it administers Chalu Residential Community and the following 11 villages:
Chalu Village
Wolongji Village
Tiantang Village
Caolou Village
Xinglou Village
Zhoudian Village
Shuilou Village
Hongcheng Village
Gongtong Village
Yuanwei Village
Lianhuasi Village

References 

Township-level divisions of Anhui
Huoqiu County